Prioneris is a genus of butterflies in the family Pieridae found in the Indomalayan realm.

Species
Prioneris autothisbe (Hübner, 1826)
Prioneris clemanthe (Doubleday, 1846)
Prioneris cornelia (van Vollenhoven, 1865)
Prioneris hypsipyle Weymer, 1887
Prioneris philonome (Boisduval, 1836)
Prioneris sita (Felder, C & R Felder, 1865)
Prioneris thestylis (Doubleday, 1842)

References

 
Pierini
Pieridae genera
Taxa named by Alfred Russel Wallace